Tim Lee-Davey (born 20 February 1955) is a British former racing driver.

Tim Lee-Davey was a member of the British Kart Team and was the Dunlop Star of Tomorrow Formula Ford Champion in 1980 driving the ex-James Weaver Tiga FF79 in his first full year of motor racing. He was also awarded a Grovewood Award Special Commendation that year.

Lee-Davey finished 17th in the British Formula Three championship in 1982 and 12th in 1983. He then competed in the World Sportscar Championship from 1984 to 1990. He competed in the 24 Hours of Le Mans in 1989 and 1990 driving a Porsche 962C for his own Team Davey.

Children: Paul Bassanello Davey,
Bianca Bassanello Davey,
Natalie Rose Davey,
Peter Jack Davey.

References

1955 births
Grovewood Award winners
Living people
British racing drivers
British Formula Three Championship drivers
FIA European Formula 3 Championship drivers
24 Hours of Le Mans drivers
World Sportscar Championship drivers